Penola may refer to the following:

Places
Antarctica
Penola Island
Penola Strait
Australia
Penola, South Australia, a town and locality
Penola Conservation Park, a protected area in South Australia
Hundred of Penola, a cadastral unit in South Australia
United States
Penola, Virginia, an unincorporated community in Virginia

Ships
 Penola, a sailing ship used for the British Graham Land expedition
SS Penola, a steamship

Other
Penola (fly), a genus of flies
Penola Catholic College, a secondary school in Victoria, Australia